Algibacter pacificus is a Gram-negative, rod-shaped and facultative anaerobic bacterium from the genus of Algibacter which has been isolated from the Caroline Seamounts from the Pacific Ocean.

References

Flavobacteria
Bacteria described in 2020